BDU may refer to:

Airports
 Bardufoss Airport (IATA code: BDU), northern Norway
 Boulder Municipal Airport (FAA LID: BDU), Colorado, United States

Universities
 Bahir Dar University, Ethiopia 
 Baku State University, Azerbaijan 
 Bharathidasan University, Tamil Nadu, India

Other
 Battle Dress Uniform, United States military camouflage clothing
 Befehlshaber der U-Boote, head of the German Navy's U-Boat arm in WWI and WWII
 Bizkaia–Durango, a cycling team based in Spain 
 Broadcast distribution undertakings, the legal term for Canadian multichannel television providers
 Brown Debating Union, a student society at Brown University, Rhode Island, United States 
 Oroko language of Cameroon (ISO 639 code: bdu)